Bergslagen Military District (Milo B), originally V Military District was a Swedish military district, a command of the Swedish Armed Forces that had operational control over the informal Bergslagen region, for most time of its existence corresponding to the area covered by the counties of Värmland, Örebro and Kopparberg (now Dalarna County). The headquarters of Milo B were located in Karlstad.

History 
Milo B was created in 1966 along with five other military districts as part of a reorganisation of the administrative divisions of the Swedish Armed Forces. It can be seen as the successor of V Military District (V. militärområdet) created in 1942, but that did not have the same tasks as Milo B. The military district consisted of the land covered by the above-mentioned counties. In 1991, the number of military districts of Sweden was decreased to five, and as a consequence of that, Milo B was merged with Eastern Military District (Milo Ö) to create a new military district, Middle Military Area (Milo M).

Units 1989
In peacetime the Bergslagen Military District consisted of the following units, which were training recruits for wartime units:

 Bergslagen Military District (Milo B), in Karlstad
 I 2/Fo 52 – Värmland Regiment / Värmland Defense District, in Karlstad
 I 3/Fo 51 – Life Regiment Grenadiers / Örebro Defense District, in Örebro
 I 13/Fo 53 – Dalarna Regiment / Kopparberg Defense District, in Falun
 A 9 – Bergslagen Artillery Regiment, in Kristinehamn
 ArtSS - Artillery School Training Center, in Älvdalen

In wartime the Bergslagen Military District would have activated the following major land units, as well as a host of smaller units:

 IB 2 - Värmland Brigade, in Karlstad, a Type 77 infantry brigade based on the I 2 - Värmland Regiment
 IB 3 - Life Brigade, in Örebro, a Type 66M infantry brigade based on the I 3 - Life Regiment Grenadiers
 NB 13 - Dalarna Brigade, in Falun, a Type 85 Norrland Brigade (optimized for arctic/winter warfare) based on the I 13 - Dalarna Regiment
 IB 33 - Närke Brigade, in Örebro, a Type 77 infantry brigade based on the I 3 - Life Regiment Grenadiers
 IB 43 - Kopparberg Brigade, in Falun, a Type 66M infantry brigade based on the I 13 - Dalarna Regiment

Heraldry and traditions

Coat of arms
The coat of arms of the Bergslagen Military District Staff 1983–1991. Blazon: "Azur, an erect sword with the area letter (B - Bergslagen) surrounded by an open chaplet of oak leaves, all or."

Commanding officers

Military commanders

1942–1944: Axel Rappe
1945–1947: Axel Bredberg
1944–1945: Bertil Uggla (acting)
1945–1947: Sven Salander (acting)
1947–1959: Sven Salander
1959–1966: Regner Leuhusen
1966–1967: Stig Synnergren
1967–1973: Stig Löfgren
1973–1979: Sigmund Ahnfelt
1979–1983: Gösta Hökmark
1983–1991: Bengt Tamfeldt

Deputy military commanders
1942–1944: Anders Bergquist
1945–1951: Harald Hægermark

Chiefs of Staff

1942–1944: Gustav Åkerman
1944–1949: Börje Furtenbach
1949–1954: Sten Langéen
1954–1960: Allan Månsson
1960–1963: Bo Sandmark
1963–1966: Åke Lundberg
1966–1968: Karl Eric Holm
1966–1968: Gunnar Nordlöf (acting)
1968–1972: Gunnar Nordlöf
1972–1974: Karl-Gösta Lundmark
1974–1984: Sven Werner
1984–1986: Percurt Green
1986–1987: Bertel Österdahl
1987–1989: Lars-Olof Strandberg
1989–1990: Bernt Östh
1990–1991: Vacant

Names, designations and locations

See also
Military district (Sweden)

References

Notes

Print

Web

Further reading

Military districts of Sweden
Disbanded units and formations of Sweden
Military units and formations established in 1942
Military units and formations disestablished in 1991
1942 establishments in Sweden
1991 disestablishments in Sweden
Stockholm Garrison
Karlstad Garrison